Fornovo may refer to:
Fornovo di Taro, in the province of Parma, Italy
Fornovo San Giovanni, in the province of Bergamo, Italy
Forum Novum (Fornovo), medieval Vescovio, in the Sabina, Italy

See also
Battle of Fornovo (1495)
Battle of Collecchio (1945), sometimes called the Battle of Collecchio-Fornovo